Riptide Cirque is a glacial cirque on the south wall of Eastwind Ridge immediately west of Mount Naab, in the Convoy Range, Victoria Land. Icefalls at the head provide the main ice flow into the Towle Glacier. One of the nautical names in Convoy Range. The name was applied by a 1989-90 New Zealand Antarctic Research Program (NZARP) field party to describe the fastest flowing tributary to Towle Glacier.
 

Cirques of Antarctica
Landforms of Victoria Land
Scott Coast